Eois chasca is a moth in the family Geometridae. It is found in Ecuador and Colombia.

Subspecies
Eois chasca chasca (Ecuador)
Eois chasca oculata (Dognin, 1919) (Colombia)

References

Moths described in 1899
Eois
Moths of South America